Bom Jardim da Serra is a municipality in the state of Santa Catarina in the South region of Brazil. It has an area of approximately 935 km².

The city is one of the coldest in Brazil and sometimes there is chance of snow.

Located at 1,245 meters above sea level, Bom Jardim da Serra is a calm city, with its 4,772 inhabitants. The average temperature is 5 °C (41 °F) in the winter and 14 °C (57 °F) during the summer. This temperature was the lowest temperature recorded in a standardized station of Santa Catarina state, surpassing the -10 ºC recorded in São Joaquim, on August 2, 1991.

See also
List of municipalities in Santa Catarina

References

Municipalities in Santa Catarina (state)